Donald Farquharson (July 27, 1834 – June 26, 1903) was a Canadian politician who served as the eighth premier of Prince Edward Island.

A native of Mermaid, Farquharson had been a teacher and then a businessman involved in wholesale and shipping. He was elected to the legislature as a Liberal in 1876 and joined the government of Louis Henry Davies in 1878 until the Davies administration fell the next year. Farquharson sat in opposition until the Liberals won the 1891 election. He became Premier in August 1898 but, in 1901, he was persuaded to run in a by-election to the federal House of Commons since PEI Liberals hoped that as a former Premier, he would be elevated to the Canadian cabinet guaranteeing the island's representation in government. Farquharson won the by-election but Sir Wilfrid Laurier appointed a westerner to cabinet instead leaving Farquharson on the backbenches until his death in 1903.

During Farquharson's premiership the provincial legislature passed the Prohibition Act (or Scott Act) which implemented a complete ban on alcohol sales and production in the province starting in 1901. It would not be repealed until 1948.

See also 

 Canada Temperance Act

External links 
Biography at the Dictionary of Canadian Biography Online

1834 births
1903 deaths
Canadian Presbyterians
Liberal Party of Canada MPs
Members of the House of Commons of Canada from Prince Edward Island
People from Queens County, Prince Edward Island
Premiers of Prince Edward Island
Prince Edward Island Liberal Party MLAs
Prince Edward Island Liberal Party leaders